The bilateral relations between Italy and the Republic of China (Taiwan) are a subject of China–Italy relations. Since Italy recognized the People's Republic of China on 6 November 1970, Italy under the One China principle maintains relations with Taiwan on an unofficial basis. Both Italy and Taiwan as part of the Japanese Empire were members of the Axis Powers in World War II.

Trade links
Despite the absence of diplomatic relations, trade links between Italy and Taiwan accounted for US$4.13 billion in 2014, with Italy being Taiwan's fifth largest trading partner in Europe. Approximately 40 Taiwanese companies had  investments in Italy worth US$322 million in 2011. In 2015, the Chamber of Deputies, the lower house of the Italian Parliament, passed a bill on avoiding double taxation with Taiwan. An agreement to that effect was completed in 2016.

Representative offices

Taiwan is represented by the "Taipei Representative Office in Italy" in Rome. This also has responsibility for San Marino, Malta, Albania and  Macedonia. This was established in 1990 as the Associazione Economica e Culturale di Taipei, before adopting its present name in 1996.

Another body, based in Milan,  known as Centro Commerciale Per L'Estremo Oriente, had previously been established as a trade office in the early 1970s. This is now known as the "Taiwan Trade Center", operated by the Taiwan External Trade Development Council.

Similarly, Italy is represented by the Italian Economic, Trade and Cultural Promotion Office. It was established in its present form in 1995. It was originally established in 1989 as the "Italian Trade and Economic Center". Arrangements for the opening of the office were made through San Shin Trading Ltd., the local agent for Fiat cars in Taiwan.

In 1992, the Office was renamed the "Italian Trade Promotion Office". In that year, it also began issuing visas. Previously, visa applications were forwarded to the Italian Consulate General in Hong Kong. In contrast to other countries, during the SARS crisis in 2003, Italy did not impose travel restrictions or quarantines on Taiwan tourists, with the Italian Economic, Trade and Cultural Promotion Office continuing to issue visas as normal.

History
During the Japanese rule of Taiwan, Japan and Italy had diplomatic relations.

Until 1970, Taiwan, as the Republic of China, was represented by an embassy in Rome and a consulate-general in Milan. This was separate from the Embassy of the Republic of China to the Holy See, which, while located in Italian territory, remains accredited to the Vatican City. This led to confusion in 1989 following the Tiananmen Square protests in Beijing, when Italians protested outside the embassy, believing it to be that of the People's Republic of China.

In 2005, the then President, Chen Shui-bian, was allowed to enter Italy to attend the funeral of Pope John Paul II, travelling on a China Airlines charter flight.

China Airlines began flights between Taipei and Rome in 1995, which became a codeshare service with Alitalia in 2003.

In 2014, Taiwan  decided not to participate in Expo 2015 in Milan after the Italian government proposed that it be represented as a corporate entity rather than as a country.

In 2020 Taiwan donated equipment and supplies to Italy as part of its medical diplomacy in response to the COVID-19 pandemic. Equipment donated included 15 respirators donated to who hospitals in the hard hit Lombardy region in April 2020.

Diplomats

Taiwan representatives to Italy
 Joe Hung (1993–2000)
 Stanley Kao (2013 – 4 June 2016)

References

 
Bilateral relations of Taiwan
Taiwan